Aaron Eugene Jones (born July 26, 1993) is an American professional basketball player who last played for Universo Treviso of the Italian Lega Basket Serie A (LBA). He played college basketball for Ole Miss.

Early life and college career
Jones attended Gautier High School in Gautier, Mississippi. During his years (2011–15) at Ole Miss, Jones averaged 3.61 PPG, with a highest average coming in his junior year, 6.00. During his senior year, Jones was suspended for three games in a "violation of team rules".

Professional career
On June 27, 2017, Jones signed a one-year deal with the Finnish team Vilpas Vikings. On November 15, 2017, Jones recorded a double-double of 33 points and 23 rebounds – a career-high in both categories, shooting 13-of-17 from the field, along with 3 steals and 4 blocks in a 96–90 overtime win over Kouvot. In 53 games played for the Vikings, Jones averaged 15.6 points, 11 rebounds, 2.3 assists and 1.8 blocks per game. Jones helped the Vikings to reach the 2018 Korisliiga Finals, where they eventually lost to Kauhajoki Karhu Basket, and he was named the league's Foreign MVP.

On July 2, 2018, Jones signed with Lhasa Pure Land of the Chinese NBL for the rest of the season.

On July 30, 2018, Jones signed a one-year deal with the Israeli team Maccabi Rehovot of the Liga Leumit. However, on October 17, 2018, he parted ways with Rehovot before appearing in a game for them.

On June 24, 2019, he signed a deal with the Crailsheim Merlins of the Basketball Bundesliga. He averaged  11.8 points and 6.5 rebounds per game. Jones signed a two-year deal with RETAbet Bilbao Basket of the Liga ACB on July 11, 2020. In eight games he averaged 4.1 points, 3.8 rebounds and 1.0 assist per game. On November 20, Jones signed with Cholet Basket of the LNB Pro A.

On July 5, 2021, Jones signed with Universo Treviso of the Lega Basket Serie A.

The Basketball Tournament
In 2017, Jones participated in The Basketball Tournament, playing for Ole Hotty Toddy, a team of Ole Miss alumni. The team was upset in the first round of the tournament by team NC Prodigal Sons. The Basketball Tournament is an annual $2 million winner-take-all tournament that is broadcast on ESPN.

References

External links
Ole Miss bio
RealGM profile

1993 births
Living people
American expatriate basketball people in Bulgaria
American expatriate basketball people in China
American expatriate basketball people in Finland
American expatriate basketball people in France
American expatriate basketball people in Germany
American expatriate basketball people in Greece
American expatriate basketball people in Spain
American men's basketball players
Basketball players from Mississippi
BC Beroe players
Bilbao Basket players
Crailsheim Merlins players
Köln 99ers players
Liga ACB players
Ole Miss Rebels men's basketball players
People from Pascagoula, Mississippi
Power forwards (basketball)
Rethymno B.C. players
Universo Treviso Basket players